Rudbaran (also Romanized as Rūdbārān and Rood Baran; also known as Rūd Yārān) is a village in Amanabad Rural District, in the Central District of Arak County, Markazi Province, Iran. At the 2006 census, its population was 163, in 58 families.

References 

Populated places in Arak County